The following is a list of the 27 cantons of the Haute-Garonne department, in France, following the French canton reorganisation which came into effect in March 2015:

 Auterive
 Bagnères-de-Luchon
 Blagnac
 Castanet-Tolosan
 Castelginest
 Cazères
 Escalquens
 Léguevin
 Muret
 Pechbonnieu
 Plaisance-du-Touch
 Portet-sur-Garonne
 Revel
 Saint-Gaudens
 Toulouse-1
 Toulouse-2
 Toulouse-3
 Toulouse-4
 Toulouse-5
 Toulouse-6
 Toulouse-7
 Toulouse-8
 Toulouse-9
 Toulouse-10
 Toulouse-11
 Tournefeuille
 Villemur-sur-Tarn

References